Markos Kolokas (Greek: Μάρκος Κολώκας; born April 21, 1977, in Athens, Greece) is a Greek former professional basketball player and professional basketball coach. At a height of 2.03 m (6 ft 8 in) tall, he played at both the small forward and power forward positions.

Professional playing career
During his professional career as a basketball player, Kolokas played with the following clubs: Amyntas, Makedonikos, Maroussi, AEL Larissa, Olimpia Larissa, Panellinios, AENK, Psychiko, and Kymis.

Post-playing career
After he retired from playing professional basketball, Kolokas worked as the team manager of the Greek club Kymis, and then as the team manager of the Greek club Panionios.

External links
EuroCup Profile
FIBA Europe Profile
Eurobasket.com Profile
Greek Basket League Profile 
Draftexpress.com Profile

1977 births
Living people
A.E.L. 1964 B.C. players
Amyntas B.C. players
Greek basketball coaches
Greek men's basketball players
Kymis B.C. players
Makedonikos B.C. players
Maroussi B.C. players
Nea Kifissia B.C. players
Olympia Larissa B.C. players
Panellinios B.C. players
Psychiko B.C. players
Power forwards (basketball)
Small forwards
Basketball players from Athens